Rodrek Edward Jones (born January 11, 1974) is a former American football offensive tackle who played six seasons in the National Football League (NFL). He started in Super Bowl XXXVI for the St. Louis Rams.

References

External links
 

1974 births
Living people
American football offensive tackles
Cincinnati Bengals players
Kansas Jayhawks football players
St. Louis Rams players
Washington Redskins players
Henry Ford High School (Detroit, Michigan) alumni
Players of American football from Detroit